Radu Sabo (born 13 September 1971) is a Romanian former footballer who played as a midfielder.

Club career
Universitatea Cluj was the team where Sabo started his football career. His first trainer was the club's legend Andrei Sepci. Between 1988 and 1996 he played constantly for the club's first team, being one of the most appreciated players of Universitatea Cluj. In 1996 Radu Sabo was transferred to Gloria Bistrița. He played one season and a half for Gloria and moved to FC Baia Mare. In 1998, he went abroad to the Hungarian side, Debreceni VSC. Sabo spent two seasons there and was transferred to Zalaegerszegi TE. He played 136 matches and scored 32 times for the Hungarian squad. In 2002, he won Borsodi Liga with Zalaegerszegi TE and played in the Champions League preliminary rounds. After five seasons played in Hungary, Radu Sabo turned back to his first team Universitatea Cluj, and helped it to promote in Liga I. On 28 June 2008, he announced his immediate retirement from professional football, in September giving his comeback at Sănătatea Cluj.

Honours
Universitatea Cluj 
 Liga II: 1991–92, 2006–07
Zalaegerszegi TE
Nemzeti Bajnokság I: 2001–02

References

External links

1971 births
Living people
Romanian footballers
FC Universitatea Cluj players
CS Minaur Baia Mare (football) players
ACF Gloria Bistrița players
Romanian expatriate footballers
Expatriate footballers in Hungary
Debreceni VSC players
Romanian expatriate sportspeople in Hungary
Zalaegerszegi TE players
Liga I players
Liga II players
Nemzeti Bajnokság I players
Association football midfielders
Sportspeople from Cluj-Napoca